Mohamed Baghlani (died 1977) was a Chadian insurgent leader during the First Chadian Civil War.

Formation of FROLINAT 
Baghlani was the most prominent Arab member of the Chadian National Union (UNT), an Islamic political party founded in 1958 and officially banned by the government of Chad in 1962. It survived as an underground movement. UNT decided to overthrow Chad's President François Tombalbaye and form in 1966 a rebel insurgent group, the FROLINAT. Baghlani played a prominent part in the Congress of Nyala in which the FROLINAT was formed.

Expulsion from FROLINAT and formation of Volcan Army 
When the FROLINAT's first leader was killed in 1968, a vicious succession fight erupted for the control of the organization. Abba Siddick emerged victorious in 1970. Siddick, who was perceived to be anti-Arab, expelled Baghlani from the FROLINAT in June.

Baghlani responded by creating a new rebel group, the Volcan Army, composed of Arab insurgents who refused to accept the leadership of Siddick. Volcan Army was based in Libya and had an Islamist tendency. For a long time it did not represent a real force on the ground.

Death 
The Volcan Army started emerging as a significant group in 1975. The following year Ahmat Acyl entered in the organization, and in January 1977 with the support of Libya attacked Baghlani's leadership. Shortly after, on March 27, Baghlani died with his chauffeur Mahamat Hissein in a car accident at Benghazi, in Libya that may have been pre-arranged.

References 

Year of birth missing
1977 deaths
Chadian Arabs
Chadian rebels
Chadian expatriates in Libya
Chadian National Union politicians
Road incident deaths in Libya